Ugeo (died 108 BC) was the last king of Wiman Joseon, the last remnant of Gojoseon. He was a grandson of Wi Man. 

Ugeo was killed by an assassin sent by a faction advocating surrender.  Even after the death of Ugeo, Gojoseon resisted the Han forces until 108 BC but lost and the Four Commanderies of Han were then set up.

Family
Wi Man (Hanja:衛満), grandfather and first king of Wiman Joseon
son and successor, name not recorded
Wi Jang (Hanja:衛長降), Son

Rebellion against Ugeo
Around the period from 128 BC to 126 BC, Canghai Commandery,covering an area in northern Korean peninsula to southern Manchuria,existed. Nan Lü (Hanja:南閭), who was a monarch of Dongye and a subject of Wiman Joseon, revolted against Ugeo of Gojoseon and then surrendered to the Han dynasty with 280,000 people. The Canghai Commandery was established following this revolution, however in 2 years, it was abolished by Gongsun Hong.

Gallery

See also
Wiman of Gojoseon
Gojoseon
Wiman Joseon
Han conquest of Gojoseon

Notes

References

Early Korean history
Wiman Joseon rulers
Wiman Joseon people
108 BC deaths
2nd-century BC rulers in Asia
Year of birth unknown
Korean people of Chinese descent

2nd-century BC Korean people